Asterophila rathbunasteri is a species of sea snail, a marine gastropod mollusk in the family Eulimidae. The species is one of three known species within the genus Asterophila; the other congeneric species are Asterophila japonica and Asterophila perknasteri.

References

External links
 To World Register of Marine Species

Eulimidae
Gastropods described in 1994